Round Top Island is a national park in North Queensland, Australia, 797 km northwest of Brisbane.

See also

 Protected areas of Queensland

References

National parks of Queensland
North Queensland